The Indian Timothy Memorial Bridge is a tied-arch bridge which spans Alpowa Creek less than half a mile before that creek joins the Snake River, about  west of Clarkston in Asotin County, Washington. It was built by the Washington State Department of Transportation in 1923 and was listed on the National Register of Historic Places in 1982.

It is the only two-span tied arch bridge in the state, and one of only five concrete tied arch bridges. It has two  arches, each of which has  rise.

It is named for Ta-moot-Tsoo (Chief Timothy), a Nez Perce Indian who lived from 1800–1891, who was "a true friend of the early settlers of Washington, Oregon, and Idaho." Chief Timothy Park is located on Silcott Island in the Snake River, close to the mouth of Alpowa Creek.

The bridge was documented by the Historic American Engineering Record in 1993, with photography by Jet Lowe.

See also
List of bridges on the National Register of Historic Places in Washington (state)
List of bridges documented by the Historic American Engineering Record in Washington (state)

References

External links

Bridges completed in 1923
Concrete bridges in the United States
Historic American Engineering Record in Washington (state)
Road bridges on the National Register of Historic Places in Washington (state)
Tied arch bridges in the United States
Transportation buildings and structures in Asotin County, Washington
1923 establishments in Washington (state)